The University of San Carlos (USC or colloquially San Carlos) is a private, Catholic, research, coeducational basic and higher education institution administered by the Philippine Southern Province of the Society of the Divine Word missionaries in Cebu City, Philippines since 1935. It offers basic education (Montessori academy, grade school, junior high school and senior high school) and higher education (undergraduate and graduate studies). Founded originally in 1595 as Colegio de San Ildefonso, it later became the Colegio-Seminario de San Carlos in 1783 and finally obtained university charter in 1948.

USC has 5 campuses with combined land area of 88 hectares or 217 acres (Talamban campus has 78 hectares). The Commission on Higher Education has recognized 8 of its programs as Centers of Excellence and 12 of its programs as Centers of Development as of March, 2016.

USC is ranked by the International/Asia Quacquarelli Symonds within 451-500 in Asia as of 2021. The Scimago institution ranking for research and innovation ranked USC as 4th (2022) among universities in the Philippines. The Institute for Research, Innovation and Scholarship (IRIS) ranking of Philippine universities research productivity in science, engineering and health ranked USC  as 8th in science, 9th in engineering and 7th in health (2021-2022).

The university is certified with the International Standards Organization 9001:2015 Quality Management System for Institutional and Student Support Services as of April 2022 by the British Standards Institution (BSI) International.

USC celebrates its 75th charter anniversary as a university on July 1, 2023, and in 2024 its 100 years as then Colegio de San Carlos.

USC has about 16,000 students (2022) who are called by the name Carolinians of which 300 are international students, enrolled in  collegiate undergraduate and graduate programs and served by about 950 academic faculty and staff with a teacher to student ratio of 1:17. About 500 Carolinian students are academic scholars.

Campuses
USC consists of five campuses in different areas of Metro Cebu – the Downtown Campus (formerly the Main Campus) along P. del Rosario St.; the Talamban Campus (TC) along Gov. Manuel Cuenco Ave., Brgy. Talamban; the North Campus (formerly the Boys High Campus) along Gen. Maxilom Ave; the South Campus (formerly the Girls High Campus) along corners J. Alcantara St. (P. del Rosario Ext.) and V. Rama Avenue; and the newest is the Montessori Academy along F. Sotto Drive (at the back of USC North Campus).

History

Claim of being the oldest in the Philippines

USC's claims as the "oldest educational institution or school in Asia" has been a long time subject of disputes with the University of Santo Tomas which on the other hand claims to be the "oldest university in Asia".

The University of San Carlos was originally founded as Colegio de San Ildefonso a primary and secondary education school. It was established by Spanish Jesuit missionaries Antonio Sedeno, Pedro Chirino and Antonio Pereira in 1595. Except for a brief period in the 18th century, the institution of education has remained in constant operation for over 400 years, obtaining university status in 1948.

It was closed in 1769 at the expulsion of the Jesuits. In 1783, Bishop Mateo Joaquin de Arevalo initiated the opening of the Colegio-Seminario de San Carlos. In 1852, the management of the college was entrusted to the Dominican Christian priests, replaced in 1867 by the Vincentian Fathers then, in 1935, by the Societas Verbi Divini or the Society of the Divine Word (SVD). The Second World War led to the interruption of the operation of the school in 1941 because several buildings suffered various degrees of destruction. The school reopened as repairs of the damaged buildings which started in 1945 were completed by 1946. The Colegio de San Carlos (CSC) was granted its university charter in 1948. The university was named after San Carlos Borromeo.

However, this position is contested by scholars. According to Fr. Aloysius Cartagenas, a professor at the Seminario Mayor de San Carlos of Cebu, “following Church tradition, the foundation event and date of University of San Carlos should be the decree of Bishop Romualdo Jimeno on 15 May 1867 (turning over the seminary to the Congregation of the Missions) and the first day of classes in the history of what is now USC is 1 July 1867, the day P. Jose Casarramona welcomed the first lay students to attend classes at the Seminario de San Carlos.” Thus, he says that San Carlos cannot claim to have descended from the Colegio de San Ildefonso founded by the Jesuits in 1595, despite taking over the latter's facilities when the Jesuits were expelled by Spanish authorities in 1769. According to him there is “no visible and clear link” between Colegio de San Ildefonso and USC. San Carlos was specifically for the training of diocesan priests, and it simply took over the facility of the former, a Jesuit central house with an attached day school.

The university, as an autonomous institute as per the modern definition of a university, started to function in 1867. Though claims have been made to its origin as an autonomous institute at the time of opening of a seminary as a religious school of indoctrination in 1783. University even stretches the claim of its origin back to founding of another center of religious teaching in 1595, which was later closed down. Thus claims about being the oldest, and being a university in its earlier versions or the claims of using shut down institutes as its constituents are concocted and disputed. In 2010, the National Historical Commission of the Philippines installed a bronze marker declaring USC's foundation late in the 18th century, effectively disproving any direct connection with the Colegio de San Ildefonso.

According to Dr. Victor Torres of the De La Salle University, the University of San Carlos' claim dates back to 1948 only when USC was declared a university. Fidel Villarroel from the University of Santo Tomas argued that USC only took over the facility of the former Colegio de San Ildefonso and that there is no 'visible' and 'clear' link between San Carlos and San Ildefonso. In 2010, the National Historical Commission of the Philippines installed a bronze marker declaring USC's foundation late in the 18th century, effectively disproving any direct connection with the Colegio de San Ildefonso.

Later history

In 1924, Colegio-Seminario de San Carlos was split into two by virtue of a Vatican decree that seminaries should only be for priestly training. One of the schools that emerged from this split was named San Carlos College. In the 1930s, the San Carlos college moved to a different location, P. Del Rosario Street, while the seminary remained at Martires Street. The Society of the Divine Word took over the college in 1935.

The Second World War saw the closure and occupation of USC by Japanese troops. Shortly before Liberation, in 1944, bombs from US planes fell on San Carlos, almost reducing the school to rubbles. San Carlos became a university in 1948, three years after it reopened. The seminary, meanwhile, was returned to diocesan control in 1998.

Following Communist persecution of the foreign clergy in China in 1949, the University of San Carlos would benefit from the migration of SVD priest-scholars to the Philippines. This accidental émigré culture in USC spawned pioneering research in anthropology, physics, engineering, philosophy, and other fields, in the Philippines. This would have tremendous impact on the nation's Post-War reconstruction.

Rapid expansion of the university during the 1960s under the leadership of foreign priest-academicians came with the decade's wave of militant nationalism, which culminated in calls for the Filipinization of the administration of all Catholic schools in the country. In 1970, Fr. Amante Castillo became the first Filipino president of USC.

Academics

The academic and curricular programs below are offered by the different schools of the university, the following are :
Basic education:
Pre-school/Montessori
Grade school (Grades 1–6)
Junior high school (Grades 7–10)
Senior high
Senior high school (Grades 11–12)
Baccalaureate Programs:
School of Architecture, Fine Arts and Design
School of Arts and Sciences
School of Business and Economics
School of Education
School of Engineering
School of Healthcare Professions
School of Law and Governance

USC houses Graduate Studies offering programs in School of Architecture, Fine Arts and Design, School of Arts and Sciences, School of Business and Economics, School of Education, School of Engineering, School of Healthcare Professions, and School of Law and Governance.

Research

The university has drawn in external grants amounting to about PHP350M (US$7M) from 2018 to 2022. Internal research grants of about PHP45M (US$830T) have also been awarded from the University Research Trust Fund within the same time period, while an additional PHP325M (US$6M) has been earmarked for laboratory facilities development anticipating the current changes in the Philippine educational system. About 140 faculty members are actively engaged in research with 315 papers published in international referred journals and 46 research collaboration agreements with international and Philippine based institutions (2018-2022).

Research efforts are supported by a print collection of over 200,000 titles and almost 10,000 non-print volumes housed in the university's library system, along with subscriptions to 17 online journals. USC also publishes three respected scholarly journals, The Philippine Scientist, the Philippine Quarterly of Culture and Society and Devotio: Journal of Business and Economics Studies. Additional support for researchers are available through offices or committees providing ethics review, intellectual property and innovation and technology support, and animal care and use.

Nineteen patents have been filed by the university with the Intellectual Property Office of the Philippines (IPOPHL) and  two patents granted from 2012 to 2022, and one start-up company, Green Enviro Management Systems (GEMS), Inc., has been established.

USC has the following specialized research centers, research groups and laboratories operated and maintained by the different academic departments:

Research Centers 

I. Newly established research centers:
 Medical Biophysics Group (MBG)-Center for Tissue Engineering and Biological Soft Materials - DOST Niche Center in the Region (NICER)
 Research and Innovation Technology Hub (RITH)

II.Regular research centers:

 Center for Geoinformatics and Environmental Solutions (CenGES)
 Center for Research of Energy Systems and Technologies (CREST)
 DOST-USC Tuklas Lunas (Drug Discovery) Development Center (TLDC)
 Marine Biology Research Section
 Cebuano Studies Center (CSC)
 Center for Social Research and Education (CSRE)
 Center for Social Entrepreneurship (CSE)
 Conservation of Heritage and Research Institute for Society and its History (CHERISH)
 Office of Population Studies (OPS)
 Water Resources Center (WRC)
 USC Museum Studies & Galleries (Spanish Colonial, Archeological, Ethnographic, Natural Science, Arcenas "Bahandi & Handuman", Finnigan Ifugao People of Cordillera, Japanese Fine Ceramics & Ningyo Dolls)
 USC Publishing House

Research Groups and Laboratories

I. Sciences research groups/laboratories:
 Biodiversity and Ecological Studies
 Marine and Aquaculture Biotechnology
 Industrial Microbiology
 Medical and Agricultural Entomology (Mosquito research laboratory)
 Molecular Biology and Diagnostics
 Environmental Chemistry and Aquatic Toxicology
 Water Laboratory
 Pharmaceutical Science, Ethno-pharmacology, Nano carriers and Drug Delivery 
 Computational Functional Materials, Nanoscience and Nanotechnology 
 Complex Systems Physics
 Materials Science
 Photonics and Optics Physics
 Multimedia and Software Development

II. Engineering research groups/laboratories:
 Advanced/Sustainable/Functional/ Smart Materials and Nanotechnology
 Bio-Process Engineering 
 Biomass and Biofuels 
 Food, Bioactive Products and Enzyme Engineering
 Environmental Sustainability 
 Construction Materials Testing and Structural Engineering
 Water Resources Management 
 Instrumentation and Process Control
 Microelectronics
 Computer Networks and Mobile Computing
 Digital Hardware and Embedded Systems
 Printed Circuit Board Design and Prototyping
 Software Engineering
 Industrial Mechatronics 
 Automation and Robotics
 Artificial Intelligence 
 Alternative and Renewable Energy
 Computer Aided Design, Engineering and Manufacturing

III. Other research groups:
 Rationalizing learning outcomes, student workload and developing flexible learning system towards an authentic outcome based education research 
 Economic Development research 
 Public Health, Nutrition and Sanitation research
 Behavioral Science and Mental Health research
 Governance and Social Justice research

University publications

Today's Carolinian 
The official student publication of USC is Today's Carolinian (TC), which is run by its editorial board and staff composed of graduate and undergraduate students of the university. The official slogan of the publication is "Our Commitment. Your Paper." According to its website and Facebook page, the publication began as a re-established student publication of the University of San Carlos during the 80's, almost 10 years after Marcos' Martial Law seized the existence of student publications and other student institutions nationwide. It happened when the students launched its first strike against the administration to reinstate the student council and the student publication of the USC. The students were victorious in reinstating the student government. The latter eventually brought back the student publication in September 1983. After some time in the early 2000s, the publication was shut down again and, with the efforts of the university's supreme student council, re-emerged in 2012.

In 2020, Today's Carolinian published an editorial on Facebook titled “A GOVERNOR IS NOT ABOVE THE CONSTITUTION,” condemning the alleged intimidation of  the Cebu Provincial Governor Gwendolyn Garcia against critics. The governor, through her personal Facebook account, invited the editor-in-chief of TC, Berns Mitra, to her office on Wednesday, March 25, 2020, to discuss the matter. For the College Editors Guild of the Philippines (CEGP), this affirms the statement of TC that the governor is trying to intimidate her critics. CEGP urged the provincial government to focus on implementing mitigating measures against Covid-19 instead of focusing on criticisms.

USC Publishing House 
The USC Publishing House is previously the USC Press. Since 1975 to present the university has published about 500 volumes of research journals and about 110 books of academic researches of the faculty, scholars, alumni and partners. The three major research journals published are the Philippine Scientist a journal of natural sciences; Philippine Quarterly of Culture and Society a journal of humanities, arts, culture, history and social sciences; Devotio: Journal of Business and Economics Studies and research journals produced by different research centers and units of USC such as the Cebuano Studies Center, Kabilin Heritage Center, Water Resources Center, Office of Population Studies, Business Resource Center, and the different academic schools and departments of the university.

The university published 37 books 
from 2008 to 2022 which cover and involve the following subjects and areas of interests :  Historical Images of Cebu during colonial era; Religious Heritage of the Archdiocese of Cebu; Ancestral Houses and Heritage Sites of Cebu and Bohol; Cebuano Literature, Poetry, Language, Culture and Arts; Philippine Architecture (partnership with the University of Michigan); 75th years of SVD Mission at USC;  Culinary Heritage of Cebu; Churches of Bohol before and after the 2013 earthquake; 75th years of the USC College of Engineering; Battle of Cebu during the American Commonwealth era; Demographic and Socio-Economic Profile of Cebu based on 2010 Census; Birds of Cebu and Bohol;   War in Cebu during the Japanese era of World War II and the History of Cebu province (consisting of 53 volumes for 3 independent cities, 6 component cities, 44 municipalities) which was commissioned by the provincial government of Cebu in 2008.

The university has also published other books “The Birds of Cebu and Bohol” which won the prestigious 34th National Book Award in the Science Category for 2015 bestowed by the National Book Development Board (NBDB) and the Manila Critic's Circle; “The Battle for Cebu” and “Pagsulay: The Churches of Bohol Before and After the 2013 Earthquake” which were also awarded as Finalists in the History and Art categories respectively.  USC Publishing House joined the annual national competition of the NBDB in 2013.

Warrior's Ink 
Official student publication of USC SHS STEM.

Recognition

 Charter and founding member of the Philippine Accrediting Association of Schools, Colleges and Universities (PAASCU), the USC Schools of Liberal Arts and Sciences, Education, Business Administration are among the first schools, colleges and undergraduate programs accredited by PAASCU since 1957. USC School of Engineering is the first PAASCU accredited engineering school in 1974. USC is reaccredited by PAASCU as Level III for 2015 to 2019 and 2020 to 2024. 
 Seven (7) programs of the School of Engineering (chemical engineering, civil engineering, computer engineering, electrical engineering, electronics engineering, mechanical engineering, industrial engineering) were granted full accreditation by the Philippine Technological Council Accreditation and Certification Board for Engineering and Technology (PTC-ACBET) the authorized accrediting body in the Philippines of the Washington Accord as of 2020.
USC has been granted autonomous status by the Commission on Higher Education (CHED) in 2001, 2005, 2009, 2016 and extended 2019.
USC is a center of excellence (COE) of the Commission on Higher Education (CHED) in eight (8) academic programs namely : anthropology, business administration, chemical engineering, entrepreneurship, mechanical engineering, office administration, physics and teacher education as of 2016 and extended 2019.
USC is a center of development (COD) of CHED in civil engineering, electrical engineering, electronics engineering, computer engineering, industrial engineering, biology, chemistry, hotel & restaurant management, information technology, marine science, philosophy and tourism.  USC is ranked top four (4) nationwide with the most centers of excellence (8 COEs) and centers of development (12 CODs) recognized by CHED as of 2016 and extended 2019.
USC is ranked among the top performing schools for 2008 to 2019 in the bar and board exams for law, accountancy, chemical engineering, chemistry, architecture, pharmacy, mechanical engineering, electrical engineering and chemical technicians.
The USC School of Law and Governance was recognized by the Legal Education Board of the Supreme Court of the Philippines for excellence in legal education as being the fourth nationwide highest passing percentage and performance in the bar exams from 2012 to 2017. The USC School of Law and Governance moot court team is the first law school in the Visayas and Mindanao regions to win as champion of the nationwide Philippines Philip Jessup Moot Court Debate competition and represent the Philippines in the world's largest and most prestigious moot court debate the International Philip Jessup Moot Court Debate competition 2014 in Washington DC. USC moot court team made it to the finals top 10 and was awarded the best novice (new) team.
USC School of Law and Governance is the only law school in the Visayas and Mindanao to be granted license by the Supreme Court to have a Clinical Legal Education Program (CLEP), whereby its senior students are allowed to handle actual cases in the court with the assistance and under the guidance of a licensed member of the bar. Likewise, it is the first law school in the Philippines outside Metro Manila to be accredited by the Supreme Court to conduct Mandatory Continuing Legal Education (MCLE) seminar for lawyers.
The USC School of Engineering is the lone Philippine university member of the School on the Internet-Asia  (SOI-Asia) , a consortium of 15 universities situated in 11 countries across Asia. It can be noted that the Philippines was first connected to the Internet at the 1st International E- mail conference held at USC in March 1994.
The USC School of Business and Economics has been selected for the 2007/2008 EDUNIVERSAL 1,000 business schools that count on Earth by an International Scientific Committee. USC accountancy clinched the top performance with highest passing percentage with at least 50 examinees and 5 board topnotchers in the May 2015, 2016 and 2018 CPA board exam.
In 2012, USC inaugurated one of the country's biggest university central library and learning resource center at the Talamban campus. Infrastructure development of USC Talamban campus is being undertaken continuously with the expansion and building of access roads within the campus, underground cabling of utilities and communication lines, construction of the new university stadium, conference and tourism center. USC Talamban campus is envisioned as an Univer-City by 2030 one of the first among the universities in the country.
USC Bio-Process Engineering Research Center (BioPERC) of the Chemical Engineering (ChE) department research and development (R&D) project on the re-use and re-utilization through biochemical processing of bio-organic wastes from processed mangoes and other tropical fruits into high value-added, healthy and anti-oxidant rich flour, fine poly-organic chemicals and activated carbon, is recognized by the World Intellectual Property Organization (WIPO) and Asia Pacific Economic Cooperation (APEC) as the "First Success Story" of an Intellectual Property (IP) technology innovation and commercialization from the academe in the Philippines. The technology developed was patented with the technical and administrative assistance of the Intellectual Property Office of the Philippines (IPOPHIL) and the USC Innovation & Technology Support Office (ITCO). The project catalyzed the inception of a new spin-off company Green Enviro Management Systems, Inc. (GEMS) which inaugurated and commenced full operation in 2015 of its processing plant facilities located in Lapu-Lapu City, Cebu.
British Council United Kingdom and Philippines Transnational Education (TNE) bilateral cooperation with the Commission of Higher Education (CHED) granted on 2017 a long term institutional support and funding to USC School of Engineering dual graduate studies program on Doctor of Engineering with Coventry University in London, and the USC School of Architecture, Fine Arts and Design graduate program on Master of Design and Arts with Cardiff Metropolitan University in London.

Criticisms and controversies

Resumption of classes during COVID-19 Lockdown 
On April 26, 2020, during Cebu City's initial ECQ as a response to COVID-19, a newspaper column by broadcaster Bobby Nalzaro worried over a reported announcement by the University of San Carlos that classes in all levels of the Cebu-based school would reopen on May 4, which is barely a week after the enhanced community quarantine in the city (ECQ) was to end under the city's original lockdown schedule of April 28. However, on April 22, Cebu City Mayor Edgar Labella reset the lifting of an ECQ to May 15. President Duterte also approved the May 15 emergency task force (or IATF-EID) recommendation for Cebu City and Cebu Province, among other cities and provinces outside Luzon. This announcement by the school sparked a large online backlash from the students, which expanded to backlash from other concerned parties after the extension was announced.

Notable alumni

See also
University of San Carlos Museum
University of San Carlos Stadium

References

External links
University of San Carlos - Cebu, Philippines

Today's Carolinian on Facebook (USC's Official Student Publication)

USC Supreme Student Council on Facebook
USC Blogspot

 
San Carlos, University of
San Carlos, University of
San Carlos, University of
Universities and colleges in Cebu City
Research universities in the Philippines
Spanish colonial infrastructure in the Philippines
Divine Word Missionaries Order
1783 establishments in the Philippines
Educational institutions established in 1783